"Shine" is a song recorded by South Korean boy group Pentagon. It was released on April 2, 2018, by Cube Entertainment and distributed by LOEN Entertainment as the lead single from the group's third extended play Positive. The Japanese version of the song was released by Cube Entertainment Japan, distributed by Universal Music Japan on August 29, 2018. The track was written by E'Dawn, Hui, Yuto, Wooseok with Flow Blow credited as the producer. This is the last Korean single to feature E'Dawn due to his hiatus and subsequent departure from the group.

The Korean music video for the song was uploaded onto 1theK's YouTube channel simultaneously with the single's release. To promote the single, the group performed on several South Korean music show programs, such as M Countdown and Inkigayo.

Composition 
"Shine" is a piano riff and minimal rhythm of this upbeat track will remind listeners of that exciting and heart beating moment of love. It was composed and written by E'Dawn, Hui, Yuto, Wooseok. Flow Blow was credited as the producer.

Background and release 
Prior to the release of the song, teasers featuring photos of Pentagon from the extended play's photoshoot, a snippet of the song and clips from its music video were released online in March 2018. The song was officially released on April 2, 2018, by Cube Entertainment and distributed by Kakao M as the group's seventh single. It served as the lead single of their third extended play, Positive. The dance practice video was uploaded on April 17, 2018.

The Japanese version was released on August 29, 2018, by Cube Entertainment Japan, distributed by Universal Music Japan. The song written by Shoko Fujibayashi, and member Yuto. It was included in the 2018 release of the group's third Japanese mini-album, Shine. A 2020 Japanese version of the song was released on September 23, 2020 on their first full-length Japanese album Universe: The History.

Music videos 
The music video for "Shine" was uploaded to 1theK and Pentagon's official YouTube channel on April 2, 2018, in conjunction with the release of the single. The song eventually becoming a sleeper hit by word of mouth from listeners due to its unique melody and powerful choreography. After seven months and nine days later, on November 11 "Shine" music video surpassed 100 million combined views. On July 1, 2020, the music video reached 200 million views on the 1theK's channel.

The music video for the Japanese version of the song was uploaded to Cube Entertainment Japan's YouTube channel on August 29, 2018. The music video was re-uploaded on 1theK's official YouTube channel on December 5, 2018.

Live performances
Pentagon promoted "Shine" by performing on several music programs in South Korea including Inkigayo, M Countdown, Music Bank, Show Champion, Show! Music Core and Simply K-Pop.

Commercial performance
Since its release, the lowest it placed on Melon's daily chart was in the 500s, but it slowly rose to number 186 on April 29. A month after its release, on May 1, the track rose to number 95 at Melon's real-time chart. The single peaked at number 16. "Shine" debuted at number 85 on Gaon Digital Chart and peaked at number 27. Subsequently, the company announced that the promotion period was extended by two weeks. They made their debut on Top 10 Billboard's World Digital Song Sales chart.

Charts

Weekly charts

Monthly charts

Credits and personnel
Credits adapted from Melon.
 Pentagon – Vocals
 E'Dawn  – Lyricist, composer
 Hui – Lyricist, composer
 Yuto – Lyricist
 Wooseok – Lyricist
 Flow Blow – Composer, arranger
 Shoko Fujibayashi – lyricist (Japanese version)

Accolades

Release history

References

2018 singles
2018 songs
Pentagon (South Korean band) songs
Cube Entertainment singles
Korean-language songs
Japanese-language songs
Songs written by Hui (singer)
Songs written by Wooseok
Kakao M singles